Chariesthes nigroapicalis is a species of beetle in the family Cerambycidae. It was described by Per Olof Christopher Aurivillius in 1903 and is known from Tanzania.

References

Endemic fauna of Tanzania
Chariesthes
Beetles described in 1903